Virginia's 15th congressional district is a defunct congressional district. It was eliminated in 1853 after the 1850 U.S. Census.  Its last Congressman was Sherrard Clemens.

List of members representing the district

References

 Congressional Biographical Directory of the United States 1774–present

15
Former congressional districts of the United States
1793 establishments in Virginia
Constituencies established in 1793
Constituencies disestablished in 1853
1853 disestablishments in Virginia